Acronychia acuminata, commonly known as Thornton aspen, is a species of shrub or small rainforest tree that is endemic to north-eastern Queensland. It has simple leaves on stems that are more or cylindrical, flowers in small groups in leaf axils and fleshy, oval to spherical fruit.

Description
Acronychia acuminata is a tree that typically grows to a height of  but flowers when only shrub-sized.

Taxonomy
Acronychia acuminata was first formally described in 1974 by Thomas Gordon Hartley in the Journal of the Arnold Arboretum from specimens collected between the Daintree and Bloomfield Rivers.

Distribution and habitat

Conservation status
Thornton aspen is classified as "near threatened" under the Queensland Government Nature Conservation Act 1992.

References

acuminata
Flora of Queensland
Plants described in 1974
Taxa named by Thomas Gordon Hartley